These are the results of the November 6, 2005, municipal elections in Quebec for the region of Chaudière-Appalaches. Some mayors and councillors were elected without opposition from October 14, 2005.

Adstock
Electors: 2 336
Voters: 1 296 (55%)
All councillors were elected without opposition.
 Mayor: Hélène Faucher
 Councillor 1: Martine Poulin
 Councillor 2: Louis-Jacques Groleau
 Councillor 3: Christian Perreault
 Councillor 4: René Raby
 Councillor 5: René Gosselin
 Councillor 6: Pierre Quirion
 Councillor 7: Serge Nadeau
 Councillor 8: Gilles Rousseau
 Councillor 9: Renaud Couture

Armagh
Mayor and councillors 2, 4 and 5 were elected without opposition.
 Mayor: Guylain Chamberland
 Councillor 1: Lucie Duchesneau
 Councillor 2: Sylvain Talbot
 Councillor 3: Lorraine Aubin
 Councillor 4: Oneil Lemieux
 Councillor 5: Gilles Lacroix
 Councillor 6: Cléonide Desjardins

Beauceville
Electors: 5 057
Voters: 3 190 (63%)
Councillor 6 was elected without opposition.
 Mayor: Jean-Guy Bolduc
 Councillor 1: Levy Mathieu
 Councillor 2: Christian Duval
 Councillor 3: Paul Veilleux
 Councillor 4: Luc Provençal
 Councillor 5: Sylvain Morin
 Councillor 6: Marc Mercier

Beaulac-Garthby
Mayor and councillors 1, 2, 3, 4 and 5 were elected without opposition.
 Mayor: Jean Binette
 Councillor 1: Jean-Claude Brochu
 Councillor 2: Loïc Lenoir
 Councillor 3: Roger Rivard
 Councillor 4: Luc Ladry
 Councillor 5: Isabelle Roberge
 Councillor 6: Jean-François Grondin

Beaumont
Electors: 1 915
Voters: 1 317 (69%)
Councillors 1 and 5 were elected without opposition.
 Mayor: André Goulet
 Councillor 1: Jean-Claude Lespérance
 Councillor 2: Kevin Lacroix
 Councillor 3: Jean-Louis Lavoie
 Councillor 4: Louise Maranda
 Councillor 5: Laval Larouche
 Councillor 6: Donald Mercier

Berthier-sur-Mer
Mayor and councillors 1, 2 and 4 were elected without opposition.
 Mayor: Rosario Bossé
 Councillor 1: Yves Lachance
 Councillor 2: Patrice Tondreau
 Councillor 3: Guy Paré
 Councillor 4: Richard Galibois
 Councillor 5: René Caron
 Councillor 6: Yolande Guillemette

Cap-Saint-Ignace
Mayor and councillors 3 and 5 were elected without opposition.
 Mayor: Marcel Catellier
 Councillor 1: Pierre Fortin
 Councillor 2: Jonathan "The John" Daigle
 Councillor 3: Sylvain Landry
 Councillor 4: André Ouellet
 Councillor 5: France Blais
 Councillor 6: Colette Guimont

Disraeli (city)
Electors: 2 180
Voters: 1 476 (68%)
Councillor 4 was elected without opposition.
 Mayor: Yvon Jolicoeur
 Councillor 1: Danielle Perron
 Councillor 2: Normand Boutin
 Councillor 3: Germain Martin
 Councillor 4: Pauline Turcotte Poirier
 Councillor 5: Rock Rousseau
 Councillor 6: Gilles Jean

Disraeli (parish)
Mayor and councillors 1 and 3 were elected without opposition.
 Mayor: André Gosselin
 Councillor 1: Rock Lessard
 Councillor 2: Marie Roy
 Councillor 3: Bertrand Lemay
 Councillor 4: Gaétan Phaneuf
 Councillor 5: Jean-Denis Nolet
 Councillor 6: Hélène Côté

Dosquet
Mayor and councillors 1, 3, 4 and 5 were elected without opposition.
 Mayor: Rénald Mongrain
 Councillor 1: René Grenier
 Councillor 2: Yvan Charest
 Councillor 3: Mélanie Turcotte
 Councillor 4: Stéphane Bédard
 Councillor 5: Jean Veilleux
 Councillor 6: Éric Charest

East Broughton
All elected without opposition.
 Mayor: Paul Grenier
 Councillor 1: Marco Poulin
 Councillor 2: Pierre Thivierge
 Councillor 3: Alain Lachance
 Councillor 4: André Grégoire
 Councillor 5: Francine Drouin
 Councillor 6: Gérard Lessard

Frampton
Mayor and councillors 1, 2, 5 and 6 were elected without opposition.
 Mayor: Sonia Paradis
 Councillor 1: François Couture
 Councillor 2: Gilles Perron
 Councillor 3: Doris Tardif
 Councillor 4: Roger Patoine
 Councillor 5: Jean-François DeBlois
 Councillor 6: Louis-Paul Audet

Honfleur
All elected without opposition.
 Mayor: Marcel Blais
 Councillor 1: Raynald Dion
 Councillor 2: Denis Chabot
 Councillor 3: Jean Lacasse
 Councillor 4: Gaétan Henry
 Councillor 5: Jacinthe Goulet
 Councillor 6: Nancy Bourassa

Irlande
Mayor and councillors 1, 3, 4, 5 and 6 were elected without opposition.
 Mayor: Bruno Vézina
 Councillor 1: Nelson Mercier
 Councillor 2: Micheline Paradis
 Councillor 3: Gilbert Pelletier
 Councillor 4: Christophe St-Amant
 Councillor 5: Christiane Laroche
 Councillor 6: Jean-François Hamel

Kinnear's Mills
All elected without opposition.
 Mayor: Marquis Bédard
 Councillor 1: Michel Horbatuk
 Councillor 2: Bernard Brun
 Councillor 3: Michel Breton
 Councillor 4: Céline Landry
 Councillor 5: Rufus Jamieson
 Councillor 6: Jean Malo

La Durantaye
Electors: 644
Voters: 345 (54%)
All councillors were elected without opposition.
 Mayor: Andrée Couillard-Després Lamontagne
 Councillor 1: Mariette Ouellet
 Councillor 2: Jean-Yves Lacroix
 Councillor 3: Claude Pouliot
 Councillor 4: Ernest Royer
 Councillor 5: Raynald Pelletier
 Councillor 6: Yvon Dumont

La Guadeloupe
All elected without opposition.
 Mayor: Marc-André Doyle
 Councillor 1: Lise Roy
 Councillor 2: Richard Morin
 Councillor 3: Normand Pouliot
 Councillor 4: Paul Joly
 Councillor 5: Ghislain Plante
 Councillor 6: Richard Fluet

Lac-Etchemin
Mayor and councillors 1, 3, 5 and 6 were elected without opposition.
 Mayor: Jean-Guy Breton
 Councillor 1: Jean Vincent
 Councillor 2: Pauline Langevin
 Councillor 3: Édith Cloutier
 Councillor 4: Harold Gagnon
 Councillor 5: Michel Giguère
 Councillor 6: Renald Provençal

Lac-Frontière
Mayor and councillors 2, 3, 4 and 6 were elected without opposition.
 Mayor: Françoise Auclair
 Councillors 1: Jean Auclair and Marie-Renie Pelchat
 Councillor 2: Marcel Lajoie
 Councillor 3: Pierre-Paul Caron
 Councillor 4: Martin Fournier
 Councillor 5: Réjean Tardif
 Councillor 6: Ghislaine Fradette

Lac-Poulin
All elected without opposition.
 Mayor: Claude Lemieux
 Councillor 1: Denis Drouin
 Councillor 2: Armand Damien
 Councillor 3: Brigitte Bolduc Baillargeon
 Councillor 4: Richard Martel
 Councillor 5: Gaston Bureau
 Councillor 6: Hugues Groleau

Laurier-Station
Mayor and councillors 2, 3, 4, 5 and 6 were elected without opposition.
 Mayor: Gérald Laganière
 Councillor 1: Marc Castonguay
 Councillor 2: Rosaire Lambert
 Councillor 3: Louise Tessier-Laganière
 Councillor 4: André Bernier
 Councillor 5: Marcel Demers
 Councillor 6: Pierrette Trépanier

Leclercville
All elected without opposition.
 Mayor: Marcel Richard
 Councillor 1: Madeleine Lemay Beaudet
 Councillor 2: Jean Beaudet
 Councillor 3: Andréanne Auger
 Councillor 4: Bruno Desrochers
 Councillor 5: Daniel Lemay
 Councillor 6: Denis Auger

Lévis
Electors: 99 041
Voters: 47 567 (48%)
 Mayor: Danielle Roy Marinelli

Desjardins
 Councillor 10: Simon Théberge
 Councillor 11: Jean Girard
 Councillor 12: André Hamel
 Councillor 13: Robert Maranda
 Councillor 14: Jean-Claude Bouchard
 Councillor 15: Ann Jeffrey

Les Chutes-de-la-Chaudière-Est
 Councillor 5: Alain Lemaire
 Councillor 6: Nicole Larouche
 Councillor 7: Guy Dumoulin
 Councillor 8: Jean-Pierre Bazinet
 Councillor 9: Jean-Luc Daigle

Les Chutes-de-la-Chaudière-Ouest
 Councillor 1: Philippe Laberge
 Councillor 2: Dominique Maranda
 Councillor 3: Anne Ladouceur
 Councillor 4: Isabelle Demers

L'Islet
Councillors 1, 2, 3 and 5 were elected without opposition.
Electors: 3 118
Voters: 1 297 (42%)
 Mayor: Jacques Bernier
 Councillor 1: Hélène Gamache
 Councillor 2: Jean-François Pelletier
 Councillor 3: Germain Pelletier
 Councillor 4: Marie-Claude Laberge
 Councillor 5: André Caron
 Councillor 6: Fernand Poitras

Lotbinière
All elected without opposition.
 Mayor: Maurice Sénécal
 Councillor 1: Pierre Chagnon
 Councillor 2: François Lafleur
 Councillor 3: Solange Lemay
 Councillor 4: Werner Banz
 Councillor 5: Nadine Demers
 Councillor 6: Gaétan Bernier

Montmagny
Electors: 9 455
Voters: 5 393 (57%)
 Mayor: Jean-Guy Desrosiers
 Councillor 1: Jean-Paul Boivin
 Councillor 2: Gaston Caron
 Councillor 3: Michel Coulombe
 Councillor 4: Michel Mercier
 Councillor 5: Michel Paquet
 Councillor 6: Jean-François Lachance

Notre-Dame-du-Sacré-Cœur-d'Issoudun
All elected without opposition.
 Mayor: Annie Thériault
 Councillor 1: Marco Julien
 Councillor 2: Nicole Deschênes
 Councillor 3: Marcelin Brûlé
 Councillor 4: Michel Boilard
 Councillor 5: Raymond Mailloux
 Councillor 6: Josée Laflamme

Notre-Dame-Auxiliatrice-de-Buckland
Mayor and councillors 1, 2, 3, 4 and 5 were elected without opposition.
 Mayor: Robert Lejeune
 Councillor 1: Daniel Talbot
 Councillor 2: Juliette Laflamme
 Councillor 3: Denis Métivier
 Councillor 4: Jean-Marc Carrier
 Councillor 5: Sylvie Corriveau
 Councillor 6: Steve Leblond

Notre-Dame-des-Pins
Electors: 843
Voters: 673 (80%)
Councillors 1, 2, 3, 4 and 6 were elected without opposition.
 Mayor: Viateur Boucher
 Councillor 1: Renald Busque
 Councillor 2: Lyne Bourque
 Councillor 3: Daniel Fortin
 Councillor 4: Jeannot Pomerleau
 Councillor 5: Stéphane Auclair
 Councillor 6: Marc Grenier

Notre-Dame-du-Rosaire
All elected without opposition.
 Mayor: Vacancy
 Councillor 1: Fernand Gagné
 Councillor 2: Léandre Côté
 Councillor 3: Georgette Collin
 Councillor 4: Clément Labrecque
 Councillor 5: André Boulet
 Councillor 6: Lionel Gaudreau

Sacré-Coeur-de-Jésus
All elected without opposition.
 Mayor: Guy Roy
 Councillor 1: Jean-Yves Faucher
 Councillor 2: René Mathieu
 Councillor 3: Gaétan Routhier
 Councillor 4: Shirley Huppé Gourges
 Councillor 5: Julien Lachance
 Councillor 6: Daniel Paré

Saint-Adalbert
All elected without opposition.
 Mayor: René Laverdière
 Councillor 1: Patrice Thériault
 Councillor 2: Nelson Lacroix
 Councillor 3: Ginette Mercier
 Councillor 4: Gaston Bourgault
 Councillor 5: Gilles Blanchet
 Councillor 6: Daniel Lagacé

Saint-Adrien-d'Irlande
Mayor and councillors 1, 2, 5 and 6 were elected without opposition.
 Mayor: Jonathan Leclair
 Councillor 1: Rock Côté
 Councillor 2: Marcel Guay
 Councillor 3: Solanges Thibault
 Councillor 4: Claude Turcotte
 Councillor 5: Jean-Marie Rodrique
 Councillor 6: Jessika Lacombe

Saint-Agapit
Electors: 2 348
Voters: 1 158 (49%)
All councillors were elected without opposition.
 Mayor: Sylvie Fortin Graham
 Councillor 1: Claudette Desrochers
 Councillor 2: Gilles Rousseau
 Councillor 3: Rosaire Lemay
 Councillor 4: Pierrette Paquin
 Councillor 5: Manon Provencher
 Councillor 6: Bernard Breton

Saint-Alfred
Electors: 382
Voters: 307 (80%)
Councillors 1, 3, 4 and 6 were elected without opposition.
 Mayor: Jean-Roch Veilleux
 Councillor 1: André Bourque
 Councillor 2: Camillien Dion
 Councillor 3: Gaétan Lessard
 Councillor 4: Huguette Poulin
 Councillor 5: Éric Giguère
 Councillor 6: Liette Tardif

Saint-Anselme
Electors: 2 665
Voters: 1 552 (58%)
Councillors 1, 2 and 6 were elected without opposition.
 Mayor: Michel Bonneau
 Councillor 1: André Lavallée
 Councillor 2: Nelson Couture
 Councillor 3: André Gagnon
 Councillor 4: Yves Marquis
 Councillor 5: Marial Morin
 Councillor 6: Normand Roy

Saint-Antoine-de-l'Isle-aux-Grues
Electors: 212
Voters: 187 (88%)
Councillors 1, 3 and 4 were elected without opposition.
 Mayor: Jacques André Roy
 Councillor 1: Denis Boulanger
 Councillor 2: Patrice Painchaud
 Councillor 3: Christian Vinet
 Councillor 4: Nancy Guichard
 Councillor 5: Gaston Robin
 Councillor 6: Michel Rousseau

Saint-Antoine-de-Tilly
Electors: 1 251
Voters: 769 (61%)
 Mayor: Michel Cauchon
 Councillor 1: Robert A. Boucher
 Councillor 2: Diane Beaulieu Désy
 Councillor 3: Johanne Guimond
 Councillor 4: Guylaine Dumont
 Councillor 5: Paul-Yvon Dumais
 Councillor 6: Rémi Bélanger

Saint-Apollinaire
Electors: 3 558
Voters: 2 025 (57%)
 Mayor: Ginette Moreau
 Councillor 1: Léopold Rousseau
 Councillor 2: Jean-Pierre Lamontagne
 Councillor 3: Jacques Fortier
 Councillor 4: André Lacasse
 Councillor 5: Mario Côté
 Councillor 6: Bernard Ouellet

Saint-Aubert
Electors: 1 411
Voters: 772 (55%)
Councillors 1, 3, 4, 5 and 6 were elected without opposition.
 Mayor: Germain Robichaud
 Councillor 1: Roger Langlois
 Councillor 2: Monique Saint-Pierre
 Councillor 3: Ghislaine Saint-Pierre Fortin
 Councillor 4: Yves Jean
 Councillor 5: Michel Paré
 Councillor 6: Bernard Baribeau

Saint-Benjamin
All elected without opposition.
 Mayor: Richard Turcotte
 Councillor 1: Benoit Shink
 Councillor 2: Régis Turcotte
 Councillor 3: Yvan Giguère
 Councillor 4: Tania Boucher
 Councillor 5: Nicol Rodrigue
 Councillor 6: Roger Caron

Saint-Benoît-Labre
Mayor and councillors 2, 3 and 6 were elected without opposition.
 Mayor: Léonide Grenier
 Councillor 1: Éric Rouillard
 Councillor 2: Jimmy Laflamme
 Councillor 3: Paul Veilleux
 Councillor 4: Marc Cloutier
 Councillor 5: Yves Boucher
 Councillor 6: Marco Marois

Saint-Bernard
All elected without opposition.
 Mayor: Liboire Lefebvre
 Councillor 1: André Gagnon
 Councillor 2: Martin Giroux
 Councillor 3: Gérard Maguire
 Councillor 4: Rachelle Roussin
 Councillor 5: Léo Breton
 Councillor 6: Jacques Lirette

Saint-Camille-de-Lellis
Mayor and councillor 5 were elected without opposition.
 Mayor: Adélard Couture
 Councillor 1: Johanne Faucher
 Councillor 2: Mario Lapointe
 Councillor 3: Richard Pouliot
 Councillor 4: Pierre Labbé
 Councillor 5: Camille Lamontagne
 Councillor 6: Serge Boutin

Saint-Charles-de-Bellechasse
All elected without opposition.
 Mayor: Charles-Eugène Blanchet
 Councillor 1: Jean-Marc Mercier
 Councillor 2: Martin Lapierre
 Councillor 3: Dominic Roy
 Councillor 4: Martin Lacasse
 Councillor 5: Michel Labrie
 Councillor 6: Réjean Lemieux

Saint-Côme–Linière
Mayor and councillors 1 and 3 were elected without opposition.
 Mayor: Gabriel Giguère
 Councillor 1: Urgel Bergeron
 Councillor 2: Alain Toulouse
 Councillor 3: Marcel Loignon
 Councillor 4: Sylvain Morin
 Councillor 5: Louis-André Poulin
 Councillor 6: Gaston Fortier

Saint-Cyprien
Electors: 516
Voters: 403 (78%)
Councillors 1, 2, 4, 5 and 6 were elected without opposition.
 Mayor: Ronald Gosselin
 Councillor 1: Gilles Audet
 Councillor 2: Jean Gilbert
 Councillor 3: Serge Fortier
 Councillor 4: Roger Rodrigue
 Councillor 5: Daniel Baillargeon
 Councillor 6: Michel Deblois

Saint-Cyrille-de-Lessard
Electors: 773
Voters: 429 (55%)
Councillors 1, 2, 4 and 6 were elected without opposition.
 Mayor: Luc Caron
 Councillor 1: Claude Dubé
 Councillor 2: Serge Guimond
 Councillor 3: Ginette Dufour
 Councillor 4: Roger Lapierre
 Councillor 5: Nelson Cloutier
 Councillor 6: Sonia Laurendeau

Saint-Damase-de-L'Islet
All elected without opposition.
 Mayor: Paulette Lord
 Councillor 1: Langis Gamache
 Councillor 2: Luc Pelletier
 Councillor 3: Rose Pelletier
 Councillor 4: France Bélanger
 Councillor 5: Priscile Pelletier
 Councillor 6: Marie-Jean Pellerin

Saint-Damien-de-Buckland
All elected without opposition.
 Mayor: Hervé Blais
 Councillor 1: Pauline Mercier
 Councillor 2: Yvon Leclerc
 Councillor 3: Line Fradette
 Councillor 4: Mario Lapierre
 Councillor 5: Gaétan Labrecque
 Councillor 6: Jean-Noël Jobin

Sainte-Agathe-de-Lotbinière
Electors: 1 039
Voters: 641 (62%)
Councillors 1, 2, 3, 4 and 6 were elected without opposition.
 Mayor: Michel Champagne
 Councillor 1: Claude Robert
 Councillor 2: Jacinthe Côté
 Councillor 3: Stéphan Croisetière
 Councillor 4: Ghislain Abel
 Councillor 5: Guy Careau
 Councillor 6: Jocelyn Martineau

Sainte-Apolline-de-Patton
Mayor was elected without opposition.
 Mayor: Gilles Turcotte
 Councillor 1: Thérèse Mercier
 Councillor 2: René Laprise
 Councillor 3: Sylvain Tanguay
 Councillor 4: Jean-Paul Deschênes
 Councillor 5: Danielle Talon Mercier
 Councillor 6: Mario Gagné

Sainte-Aurélie
Mayor and councillors 1, 3 and 6 were elected without opposition.
 Mayor: Mario Pouliot
 Councillor 1: Julie Bélanger
 Councillor 2: Luc Bélanger
 Councillor 3: Nicole Lambert
 Councillor 4: Éric Rainville
 Councillor 5: Céline Giguère
 Councillor 6: Hugo Bélanger

Sainte-Claire
Mayor and councillors 1, 3, 4, 5 and 6 were elected without opposition.
 Mayor: Fernand Fortier
 Councillor 1: Denis Forgues
 Councillor 2: Denise Dulac
 Councillor 3: Marie-Lyse Laliberté
 Councillor 4: Jean-Marc St-Jean
 Councillor 5: Jean-Guy Fournier
 Councillor 6: Jean-Marie Brûlé

Sainte-Clotilde-de-Beauce
All elected without opposition.
 Mayor: Jacques Lussier
 Councillor 1: Rodolphe Pomerleau
 Councillor 2: Denis Grenier
 Councillor 3: Alexandre Mercier
 Councillor 4: Gérald Grenier
 Councillor 5: Paulette Pomerleau
 Councillor 6: Bruno Trépanier

Sainte-Croix
Electors: 1 942
Voters: 982 (51%)
All councillors were elected without opposition.
 Mayor: Jacques Gauthier
 Councillor 1: Jean Lafleur
 Councillor 2: Berchmans Dancause
 Councillor 3: Michel Routhier
 Councillor 4: Jean-Pierre Ducruc
 Councillor 5: Gratien Tardif
 Councillor 6: Michel Cameron

Saint-Édouard-de-Lotbinière
Electors: 1 051
Voters: 595 (57%)
Councillors 2, 3 and 5 were elected without opposition.
 Mayor: Jean-Michel Leclerc
 Councillor 1: Steve Tellier
 Councillor 2: Raphaël Bernier
 Councillor 3: Alain Soucy
 Councillor 4: Chantale Belleau
 Councillor 5: André Poulin
 Councillor 6: Marco Leclerc

Sainte-Euphémie-sur-Rivière-du-Sud
Electors: 374
Voters: 313 (84%)
 Mayor: André Mercier
 Councillor 1: Gérald Huel
 Councillor 2: Michel Laprise
 Councillor 3: Sylvain Mercier
 Councillor 4: Sandra Duval
 Councillor 5: Éric Langlois
 Councillor 6: Jacques Turgeon

Sainte-Félicité
All elected without opposition.
 Mayor: Georges St-Pierre
 Councillor 1: Josée Pellerin
 Councillor 2: Hilaire Dubé
 Councillor 3: Guylaine Chouinard
 Councillor 4: Guy Pellerin
 Councillor 5: Lucie Bourgault
 Councillor 6: Marius Morneau

Sainte-Hénédine
All elected without opposition.
 Mayor: Yvon Asselin
 Councillor 1: Diane Lévesque
 Councillor 2: Lauréat Bolduc
 Councillor 3: Pierre Nadeau
 Councillor 4: Éric Carbonneau
 Councillor 5: Yvon Turmel
 Councillor 6: Gaétan Nadeau

Sainte-Justine
All elected without opposition.
 Mayor: Marcel Morissette
 Councillor 1: Bernard Poulin
 Councillor 2: André Ferland
 Councillor 3: Émilien Cayouette
 Councillor 4: Cécile Veilleux
 Councillor 5: Gilles Bizier
 Councillor 6: Linda Gosselin

Sainte-Louise
All elected without opposition.
 Mayor: Vacancy
 Councillor 1: Normand Dubé
 Councillor 2: René Castonguay
 Councillor 3: André Vézina
 Councillor 4: Marc-André Dufour
 Councillor 5: Pierre Lizotte
 Councillor 6: Alain Bois

Sainte-Lucie-de-Beauregard
All elected without opposition.
 Mayor: Louis Lachance
 Councillor 1: Bruno Couette
 Councillor 2: Jerry Gonthier
 Councillor 3: Carole Leclerc
 Councillor 4: Germain Couette
 Councillor 5: Tony Lajoie
 Councillor 6: Réal Gonthier

Saint-Elzéar
All elected without opposition.
 Mayor: Richard Lehoux
 Councillor 1: Jeannine Drouin Gilbert
 Councillor 2: Suzanne Lapointe
 Councillor 3: Richard Laplante
 Councillor 4: Alain Gilbert
 Councillor 5: Michèle Grenier
 Councillor 6: Roger Walsh

Sainte-Marguerite
Electors: 862
Voters: 477 (55%)
Councillors 2, 3, 4, 5 and 6 were elected without opposition.
 Mayor: Adrienne Gagné
 Councillor 1: Pierre Trudel
 Councillor 2: Robert Normand
 Councillor 3: Martin Faucher
 Councillor 4: Philippe Marcoux
 Councillor 5: Henry Perreault
 Councillor 6: Emile Nadeau

Sainte-Marie
Mayor and councillors 1, 2, 3, 4 and 6 were elected without opposition.
 Mayor: Harold Guay
 Councillor 1: Christian Laroche
 Councillor 2: Mélanie Boissonneault
 Councillor 3: Rosaire Simoneau
 Councillor 4: Patrice Cossette
 Councillor 5: Paulin Nappert
 Councillor 6: Yves Chassé

Sainte-Perpétue
Mayor and councillors 2 and 6 were elected without opposition.
 Mayor: Céline Avoine Cloutier
 Councillor 1: André Daigle
 Councillor 2: Raynald Gauthier
 Councillor 3: Isabelle Vaillancourt
 Councillor 4: Nicole Lebel
 Councillor 5: Serge Dubé
 Councillor 6: Aurèle Gagnon

Saint-Éphrem-de-Beauce
Electors: 1 960
Voters: 1 159 (59%)
Councillors 4 and 6 were elected without opposition.
 Mayor: Luc Lemieux
 Councillor 1: Camille Couture
 Councillor 2: Normand Roy
 Councillor 3: Céline Marois
 Councillor 4: Gaétan Lessard
 Councillor 5: Michel Quirion
 Councillor 6: André Longchamps

Sainte-Praxède
All elected without opposition.
 Mayor: Gérald McKenzie
 Councillor 1: Jean-François Roy
 Councillor 2: Paul Audet
 Councillor 3: Lise Gosselin
 Councillor 4: Daniel Talbot
 Councillor 5: Gilles Deshaies
 Councillor 6: Gaétan Lapointe

Sainte-Rose-de-Watford
All elected without opposition.
 Mayor: Hector Provençal
 Councillor 1: Lisette Côté Gagnon
 Councillor 2: Carolin Roy
 Councillor 3: André Loubier
 Councillor 4: Mario Provençal
 Councillor 5: Rock Carrier
 Councillor 6: Richard Fauchon

Sainte-Sabine
Mayor and councillors 1, 2, 3, 4 and 6 were elected without opposition.
 Mayor: Denis Boutin
 Councillor 1: Renaud Chabot
 Councillor 2: Denis Asselin
 Councillor 3: Linda Fournier
 Councillor 4: Francis Guay
 Councillor 5: Sylvain Boutin
 Councillor 6: Sylvain Bédard

Saint-Évariste-de-Forsyth
All elected without opposition.
 Mayor: Gaétan Bégin
 Councillor 1: Martine Giguère
 Councillor 2: Germain Paquet
 Councillor 3: Carole Rouleau
 Councillor 4: Paulette Lessard
 Councillor 5: Joel Jacques
 Councillor 6: Marie-Claude Beaudry

Saint-Fabien-de-Panet
All elected without opposition.
 Mayor: Pierre Thibaudeau
 Councillor 1: Steve Guimond
 Councillor 2: Jean-Guy Grégoire
 Councillor 3: Marilyn Francoeur
 Councillor 4: Danielle Imbeault
 Councillor 5: Jeannine Lachance Mercier
 Councillor 6: Nancy Bilodeau

Saint-Flavien
Electors: 1 133
Voters: 693 (61%)
Councillors 1, 2, 4, 5 and 6 were elected without opposition.
 Mayor: Roland Gagnon
 Councillor 1: Patrick Demers
 Councillor 2: Lucie Bédard
 Councillor 3: Sophie Roy
 Councillor 4: Michel Leclerc
 Councillor 5: Normand Côté
 Councillor 6: Gabriel Turgeon

Saint-Fortunat
All elected without opposition.
 Mayor: Réjean Fortier
 Councillor 1: Rosaire Dubé
 Councillor 2: Denis Fortier
 Councillor 3: Yvon Allaire
 Councillor 4: Normand Girard
 Councillor 5: Jeannette Marcoux Garneau
 Councillor 6: Michel Baril

Saint-François-de-la-Rivière-du-Sud
Mayor and councillors 1, 3, 5 and 6 were elected without opposition.
 Mayor: Pierre Jean
 Councillor 1: Yves Laflamme
 Councillor 2: Mario Marcoux
 Councillor 3: Renald Roy
 Councillor 4: Auguste Boulet
 Councillor 5: Gaston Garant
 Councillor 6: Jean-Yves Gosselin

Saint-Frédéric
Mayor and councillors 1, 2, 3 and 5 were elected without opposition.
 Mayor: Henri Gagné
 Councillor 1: Yves Rodrigue
 Councillor 2: Harold Gilbert
 Councillor 3: Gaétan Vachon
 Councillor 4: Yvon Landry
 Councillor 5: Jean-Paul Labbé
 Councillor 6: Denis Vachon

Saint-Gédéon-de-Beauce
All elected without opposition.
 Mayor: Éric Lachance
 Councillor 1: Christian Bégin
 Councillor 2: Claude Tanguay
 Councillor 3: Johanne Giroux
 Councillor 4: Francis Moreau
 Councillor 5: Laurent-Paul Gagné
 Councillor 6: Stéphane Robert

Saint-Georges
Electors: 22 725
Voters: 10 797 (48%)
Councillor 5 was elected without opposition.
 Mayor: Roger Carette
 Councillor 1: Serge Paquet
 Councillor 2: Daniel Lessard
 Councillor 3: Jean Perron
 Councillor 4: Irma Quirion
 Councillor 5: Régis Drouin
 Councillor 6: Marie-Ève Dutil
 Councillor 7: Karen Hilchey
 Councillor 8: Marcel Bérubé

Saint-Gervais
All elected without opposition.
 Mayor: Jacques Nadeau
 Councillor 1: Gilles Nadeau
 Councillor 2: Denise Lapierre
 Councillor 3: Daniel Nadeau
 Councillor 4: Benoit Godbout
 Councillor 5: Marc Asselin
 Councillor 6: Jean-Marc Lemieux

Saint-Gilles
Electors: 1 516
Voters: 874 (58%)
Councillors 1, 2, 4, 5 and 6 were elected without opposition.
 Mayor: Robert Samson
 Councillor 1: Michel Flamand
 Councillor 2: Dany Aubert
 Councillor 3: Huguette Robitaille
 Councillor 4: Carole Dubois
 Councillor 5: Alain Roger
 Councillor 6: Claude Blais

Saint-Henri
Mayor and councillors 1, 4 and 6 were elected without opposition.
 Mayor: Yvon Bruneau
 Councillor 1: Germain Caron
 Councillor 2: Jérôme Couture
 Councillor 3: Michel Tardif
 Councillor 4: Michel L'Heureux
 Councillor 5: Jules Roberge
 Councillor 6: Linda Roy

Saint-Hilaire-de-Dorset
Mayor and councillors 1, 2, 3, 5 and 6 were elected without opposition.
 Mayor: Renaud Tanguay
 Councillor 1: Lionel Jacques
 Councillor 2: Francine Fournier
 Councillor 3: Carole Beaudoin
 Councillor 4: Michel Breton
 Councillor 5: Germain Létourneau
 Councillor 6: Céline Bilodeau

Saint-Honoré-de-Shenley
All elected without opposition.
 Mayor: Herman Bolduc
 Councillor 1: Richard Vermette
 Councillor 2: Vacancy
 Councillor 3: Vacancy
 Councillor 4: Vacancy
 Councillor 5: Denis Champagne
 Councillor 6: Éric Lapointe

Saint-Isidore
Electors: 2 091
Voters: 1 035 (49%)
Councillors 2, 3, 4 and 6 were elected without opposition.
 Mayor: Clément Morin
 Councillor 1: Dominique Boutin
 Councillor 2: Daniel Blais
 Councillor 3: Marc Chalhoub
 Councillor 4: Éric Blanchette
 Councillor 5: Louise Turmel
 Councillor 6: Hélène Jacques

Saint-Jacques-le-Majeur-de-Wolfestown
All elected without opposition.
 Mayor: Steven Laprise
 Councillor 1: Sylvie Coté
 Councillor 2: Claude Laroche
 Councillor 3: Yolande Moreau
 Councillor 4: Normand Dubois
 Councillor 5: Sylvie Moisan
 Councillor 6: Jean-Marc Carrier

Saint-Jacques-de-Leeds
All elected without opposition.
 Mayor: Philippe Chabot
 Councillor 1: Richard Dubois
 Councillor 2: Denis Ferland
 Councillor 3: Michel Paré
 Councillor 4: Normand Payeur
 Councillor 5: Marcel Guay
 Councillor 6: Roger Cyr

Saint-Janvier-de-Joly
Mayor and councillors 1, 3, 4 and 5 were elected without opposition.
 Mayor: Bernard Fortier
 Councillor 1: Martin Lauzé
 Councillor 2: Éric Boilard
 Councillor 3: Luc Bergeron
 Councillor 4: Réal Laverrière
 Councillor 5: Pierre Demers
 Councillor 6: Yves Turmel

Saint-Jean-de-Brébeuf
Mayor and councillors 1 and 6 were elected without opposition.
 Mayor: Ghislain Hamel
 Councillor 1: Ghislain Champagne
 Councillor 2: Gervais Côté
 Councillor 3: Guy Mercier
 Councillor 4: Christian Dostie
 Councillor 5: Raymond Dempsey
 Councillor 6: Gisèle Carrier Martel

Saint-Jean-Port-Joli
Mayor and councillors 4, 5 and 6 were elected without opposition.
 Mayor: Jean-Pierre Dubé
 Councillor 1: Jean-Pierre Lebel
 Councillor 2: Étienne Guay
 Councillor 3: Louise Fortin
 Councillor 4: Marcellin Frégeau
 Councillor 5: Judith St-Pierre
 Councillor 6: Josette Dubé

Saint-Joseph-de-Beauce
Electors: 3 573
Voters: 2 071 (58%)
Councillors 3 and 6 were elected without opposition.
 Mayor: Michel Cliche
 Councillor 1: Robert Gilbert
 Councillor 2: Lucille Pelletier
 Councillor 3: Claude Vachon
 Councillor 4: Normand Boutin
 Councillor 5: Pierrot Lagueux
 Councillor 6: Gaétan Roy

Saint-Joseph-de-Coleraine
Electors: 1 695
Voters: 951 (56%)
Councillors 1, 2, 5 and 6 were elected without opposition.
 Mayor: Josette Vaillancourt
 Councillor 1: Yves Samson
 Councillor 2: Viateur Dubois
 Councillor 3: Vacancy
 Councillor 4: Réal Lévesque
 Councillor 5: Denis Rousseau
 Councillor 6: Lucille Roy

Saint-Joseph-des-Érables
Electors: 379
Voters: 310 (82%)
All councillors were elected without opposition.
 Mayor: Louis Jacques
 Councillor 1: Jeannot Roy
 Councillor 2: Alain Fortin
 Councillor 3: Paul Doyon
 Councillor 4: Jean-Louis Grondin
 Councillor 5: Mario Lessard
 Councillor 6: Simon Cliche

Saint-Jules
All elected without opposition.
 Mayor: Ghislaine Doyon
 Councillor 1: Josée Mathieu
 Councillor 2: Michel Paré
 Councillor 3: Yves Jacques
 Councillor 4: Michel Lapointe
 Councillor 5: Maurice Cloutier
 Councillor 6: Michel Tardif

Saint-Julien
Mayor and councillors 1, 2, 4, 5 and 6 were elected without opposition.
 Mayor: Jacques Laprise
 Councillor 1: Raymond Cossette
 Councillor 2: Réjean Beaudoin
 Councillor 3: Serge Laliberté
 Councillor 4: Jean-Guy Faucher
 Councillor 5: Yves Provencher
 Councillor 6: Lynda Lemay

Saint-Just-de-Bretenières
All elected without opposition.
 Mayor: Réal Bolduc
 Councillor 1: Luc Ouellet
 Councillor 2: Laurent Bolduc
 Councillor 3: Annie Boulet
 Councillor 4: Lise Robert
 Councillor 5: Simon Pelchat
 Councillor 6: Réjean Poulin

Saint-Lambert-de-Lauzon
Electors: 4 194
Voters: 1 241 (30%)
Councillors 2, 3, 4, 5 and 6 were elected without opposition.
 Mayor: François Barret
 Councillor 1: Clément Dumais
 Councillor 2: Hermann Thibodeau
 Councillor 3: Paul Taillefer
 Councillor 4: Martin Boivin
 Councillor 5: Stéphane Lévesque
 Councillor 6: Lisette Moreau

Saint-Lazare-de-Bellechasse
Electors: 985
Voters: 566 (57%)
All councillors were elected without opposition.
 Mayor: Martin J. Côté
 Councillor 1: Martial Labonté
 Councillor 2: Hélène Bourdonnais
 Councillor 3: Michèle Lemelin
 Councillor 4: Fernand Labbé
 Councillor 5: Simon Goupil
 Councillor 6: Alain Chabot

Saint-Léon-de-Standon
Electors: 1 095
Voters: 733 (67%)
Councillors 1, 2, 3, 5 and 6 were elected without opposition.
 Mayor: Bernard Morin
 Councillor 1: Gilles Vachon
 Councillor 2: Julien Noël
 Councillor 3: André Corriveau
 Councillor 4: Patrick Laflamme
 Councillor 5: Pierrette Parent
 Councillor 6: Sylvain Vallières

Saint-Louis-de-Gonzague
Mayor and councillors 1, 2, 5 and 6 were elected without opposition.
 Mayor: Suzanne Campeau Guenette
 Councillor 1: Nancy Dumas
 Councillor 2: Claude Roy
 Councillor 3: Marco Dumas
 Councillor 4: Normande Laflamme
 Councillor 5: Yollande Rancourt Bilodeau
 Councillor 6: Jérôme Bernier

Saint-Luc-de-Bellechasse
Electors: 482
Voters: 352 (73%)
 Mayor: René Leclerc
 Councillor 1: Jean Hébert
 Councillor 2: Charles Lagrange
 Councillor 3: Carole Couture
 Councillor 4: Patrice Perreault
 Councillor 5: Nicole Bilodeau
 Councillor 6: André Turcotte

Saint-Magloire
Mayor and councillors 1, 2, 3, 4 and 6 were elected without opposition.
 Mayor: Marcel Asselin
 Councillor 1: Marielle Lemieux
 Councillor 2: Rosaire Lapointe
 Councillor 3: Félicien Prévost
 Councillor 4: Marc-André Lapointe
 Councillor 5: Daniel Thibault
 Councillor 6: Julie Bercier

Saint-Malachie
Electors: 1 236
Voters: 547 (44%)
Councillors 1, 2, 4 and 6 were elected without opposition.
 Mayor: Vital Labonté
 Councillor 1: Evelyn O'Brien
 Councillor 2: Odette Lapointe
 Councillor 3: Jacques Lindsay
 Councillor 4: Richard Jacques
 Councillor 5: Marc Théberge
 Councillor 6: Raymond Aubé

Saint-Marcel
Mayor and councillors 1, 2, 3, 5 and 6 were elected without opposition.
 Mayor: Clément Bernier
 Councillor 1: Marcel Bélanger
 Councillor 2: France Pelletier
 Councillor 3: Bertrand Bélanger
 Councillor 4: Stéphane Morin
 Councillor 5: Marc Pelletier
 Councillor 6: Jacinthe Caron

Saint-Martin
Electors: 2 055
Voters: 1 263 (61%)
Councillors 1, 4, 5 and 6 were elected without opposition.
 Mayor: Jean-Marc Paquet
 Councillor 1: Danielle Quirion
 Councillor 2: Normand Thériault
 Councillor 3: Éric Giguère
 Councillor 4: Robert Joly
 Councillor 5: Yolande Faulkner
 Councillor 6: Cécile Champagne

Saint-Michel-de-Bellechasse
Mayor and councillors 1, 2, 3, 5 and 6 were elected without opposition.
 Mayor: Léonard Leclerc
 Councillor 1: Suzanne Côté
 Councillor 2: François Thériault
 Councillor 3: Nelson Vachon
 Councillor 4: Liliane Breton
 Councillor 5: Josée Boutin
 Councillor 6: Laurent Poiré

Saint-Narcisse-de-Beaurivage
All elected without opposition.
 Mayor: Denis Dion
 Councillor 1: Anthony Audesse
 Councillor 2: Henry Blaney
 Councillor 3: Kevin Blaney
 Councillor 4: Norbert Drapeau
 Councillor 5: Réal Boucher
 Councillor 6: Yves Joly

Saint-Nazaire-de-Dorchester
Mayor and councillors 1, 5 and 6 were elected without opposition.
 Mayor: Claude Lachance
 Councillor 1: Stéphane Turgeon
 Councillor 2: Sylvie Leclerc
 Councillor 3: Serge Béchard
 Councillor 4: Gaétan Fillion
 Councillor 5: Fidel Fillion
 Councillor 6: François Bruneau

Saint-Nérée
Electors: 787
Voters: 458 (58%)
Councillors 1, 2, 3 and 5 were elected without opposition.
 Mayor: Clément Vallières
 Councillor 1: Mario Rémillard
 Councillor 2: Lyse Ratté
 Councillor 3: Christiane Asselin
 Councillor 4: Pascal Fournier
 Councillor 5: Claude Guillemette
 Councillor 6: Dominic Larochelle

Saint-Odilon-de-Cranbourne
All elected without opposition.
 Mayor: Marc-André Labbé
 Councillor 1: Jean-Marc Giguère
 Councillor 2: Alain Nolet
 Councillor 3: Alain St-Hilaire
 Councillor 4: Denise Roy
 Councillor 5: Charles Drouin
 Councillor 6: Patrice Giguère

Saint-Omer
Mayor and councillors 1, 2 and 3 were elected without opposition.
 Mayor: Réjeanne Godbout
 Councillor 1: Jean-Marie Fortin
 Councillor 2: Bertrand Fortin
 Councillor 3: Réjane St-Amand
 Councillor 4: Johanne Fortin
 Councillor 5: Marise Bourgault
 Councillor 6: Éric Caron

Saint-Pamphile
Electors: 2 213
Voters: 1 407 (64%)
Councillors 1 and 5 were elected without opposition.
 Mayor: Réal Laverdière
 Councillor 1: Clément Vaillancourt
 Councillor 2: Carmen Chouinard
 Councillor 3: Henri Miville
 Councillor 4: Mario Leblanc
 Councillor 5: Bertrand Vaillancourt
 Councillor 6: Clermont Pelletier

Saint-Patrice-de-Beaurivage
All elected without opposition.
 Mayor: Marlène Demers
 Councillor 1: Denis Sylvain
 Councillor 2: Mario Gagné
 Councillor 3: Denis Toutant
 Councillor 4: Clément Carrier
 Councillor 5: Bruno Roussin
 Councillor 6: Huguette Lefebvre

Saint-Paul-de-Montminy
Electors: 872
Voters: 455 (52%)
Councillors 3, 5 and 6 were elected without opposition.
 Mayor: Émile Tanguay
 Councillor 1: Yves Gagné
 Councillor 2: Colette Nicol
 Councillor 3: Christian Nadeau
 Councillor 4: Michel Boivin
 Councillor 5: Diane Deschênes
 Councillor 6: Jean-François Arsenault

Saint-Philémon
All elected without opposition.
 Mayor: Joseph Talbot
 Councillor 1: Steeve Mercier
 Councillor 2: Stéphan Gignac
 Councillor 3: Marie-Paule Therrien
 Councillor 4: Christian Labrecque
 Councillor 5: Francis Lemieux
 Councillor 6: Roger Nicol

Saint-Philibert
All elected without opposition.
 Mayor: Marc Nadeau
 Councillor 1: René Francoeur
 Councillor 2: Bernard Paquet
 Councillor 3: Denis Paquet
 Councillor 4: Chantal Robitaille
 Councillor 5: Bernard Rodrigue
 Councillor 6: Rémi Loignon

Saint-Pierre-de-la-Rivière-du-Sud
Electors: 721
Voters: 503 (70%)
Councillors 1, 2, 3, 5 and 6 were elected without opposition.
 Mayor: Alain Fortier
 Councillor 1: Marie-Eve Proulx
 Councillor 2: Daniel Samson
 Councillor 3: Claude Cloutier
 Councillor 4: Pierre Marchand
 Councillor 5: Claude Fiset
 Councillor 6: Robert Beaumont

Saint-Pierre-de-Broughton
Electors: 811
Voters: 626 (77%)
Councillor 5 was elected without opposition.
 Mayor: Nicole Bourque
 Councillor 1: Lise Vachon
 Councillor 2: Christine Lapointe
 Councillor 3: Rosaire Blais
 Councillor 4: Ghislain Labrecque
 Councillor 5: Damien Blais
 Councillor 6: Fernand Laplante

Saint-Prosper
Electors: 2 920
Voters: 1 580 (54%)
Councillors 2, 4 and 5 were elected without opposition.
 Mayor: Raynald Fortin
 Councillor 1: Guillaume Rodrigue
 Councillor 2: Pierre Poulin
 Councillor 3: Bruno Reny
 Councillor 4: Jean-Simon Maheux
 Councillor 5: Ginette Lajoie-Samson
 Councillor 6: Marc jr Caron

Saint-Raphaël
Electors: 1 933
Voters: 945 (49%)
 Mayor: Clément Lacroix
 Councillor 1: Gilles Breton
 Councillor 2: Louise Bélanger
 Councillor 3: Alcide Doiron
 Councillor 4: Rémi Labrecque
 Councillor 5: Louise Aubé
 Councillor 6: Micheline Cayer-Bouchard

Saint-René
All elected without opposition.
 Mayor: Jean-Guy Deblois
 Councillor 1: Elzéar Dupuis
 Councillor 2: Louise Lessard
 Councillor 3: Claude Giguère
 Councillor 4: Rémi Morin
 Councillor 5: Marcel Landry
 Councillor 6: Mariève Lagrange

Saint-Roch-des-Aulnaies
All elected without opposition.
 Mayor: Michel Castonguay
 Councillor 1: Marc-André Rioux
 Councillor 2: Réal Pelletier
 Councillor 3: Chantal Thibodeau
 Councillor 4: Gilbert Bélanger
 Councillor 5: Gisèle Lebrun-Gagnon
 Councillor 6: Claude Hudon

Saints-Anges
Electors: 906
Voters: 661 (73%)
All councillors were elected without opposition.
 Mayor: Rodrigue Boily
 Councillor 1: Roger Bédard
 Councillor 2: Lucille Cloutier Perreault
 Councillor 3: Roger Picard
 Councillor 4: Pierre Lagrange
 Councillor 5: Claude Roy
 Councillor 6: Rémi Drouin

Saint-Séverin
Saint-Séverin Élection à la mairie
Electors: 283
Voters: 237 (84%)
All councillors were elected without opposition.
 Mayor: Daniel Perron
 Councillor 1: François Nadeau
 Councillor 2: Denis Lehoux
 Councillor 3: Patricia Labbé
 Councillor 4: Colette Roy
 Councillor 5: Patrick Pomerleau
 Councillor 6: François Proulx

Saint-Simon-les-Mines
All elected without opposition.
 Mayor: Martin Busque
 Councillor 1: Pascal Mathieu
 Councillor 2: Stephan Raby
 Councillor 3: Claude Lessard
 Councillor 4: Chantal Samson
 Councillor 5: Georges-Aimé Poulin
 Councillor 6: Christine Caron

Saint-Sylvestre
All elected without opposition.
 Mayor: Mario Grenier
 Councillor 1: Madeleine St-Hilaire
 Councillor 2: Maryse Lapointe
 Councillor 3: Richard Therrien
 Councillor 4: Roland Gagné
 Councillor 5: Jean-Louis Drouin
 Councillor 6: Raynald Champagne

Saint-Théophile
Mayor and councillors 1, 2, 4, 5 and 6 were elected without opposition.
 Mayor: Roland Boucher
 Councillor 1: René Paquet
 Councillor 2: André Poulin
 Councillor 3: Mathieu Poulin
 Councillor 4: Mario Lefebvre
 Councillor 5: Étienne Bédard
 Councillor 6: Ghyslain Faucher

Saint-Vallier
Electors: 893
Voters: 593 (66%)
Councillors 2 and 5 were elected without opposition.
 Mayor: Jean Lemieux
 Councillor 1: Jacques Larivière
 Councillor 2: Tony Langevin
 Councillor 3: Jean-Marc Corriveau
 Councillor 4: Marc Therrien
 Councillor 5: Henri Mercier
 Councillor 6: Gilles Daigle

Saint-Victor
Mayor and councillors 1 and 4 were elected without opposition.
 Mayor: Roland Giguère
 Councillor 1: Marise Poulin
 Councillor 2: Jacinthe Gagnon
 Councillor 3: Michel Bolduc
 Councillor 4: Jonathan V. Bolduc
 Councillor 5: Pierre Rochette
 Councillor 6: Harold Bureau

Saint-Zacharie
Electors: 1 705
Voters: 994 (58%)
Councillors 1, 2, 4 and 6 were elected without opposition.
 Mayor: Daniel Gagné
 Councillor 1: St-Georges Cloutier
 Councillor 2: Gaétan Garant
 Councillor 3: Carmelle Larivière
 Councillor 4: Christian Morin
 Councillor 5: Vacancy
 Councillor 6: Jean-François Fecteau

Scott
Electors: 1 465
Voters: 926 (63%)
Councillors 1, 5 and 6 were elected without opposition.
 Mayor: Yvan Leblond
 Councillor 1: Clément Marcoux
 Councillor 2: Ghislain Pouliot
 Councillor 3: Clément Roy
 Councillor 4: Claude Poulin
 Councillor 5: Johnny Carrier
 Councillor 6: Myriam Drouin

Tourville
All elected without opposition.
 Mayor: Michel Anctil
 Councillor 1: Luce Morneau
 Councillor 2: Francine Fournier P.
 Councillor 3: Benoit Dubé
 Councillor 4: Raymond Desgagnés
 Councillor 5: Mario Gagnon
 Councillor 6: Dany Joncas

Tring-Jonction
Mayor and councillors 1, 2, 3, 4 and 6 were elected without opposition.
 Mayor: Christian Jacques
 Councillor 1: Renaud Lessard
 Councillor 2: Michel Cliche
 Councillor 3: Gaétan Vachon
 Councillor 4: Marquis Lessard
 Councillor 5: François St-Cyr
 Councillor 6: Jean-Marie Cloutier

Val-Alain
Mayor and councillors 1, 2, 3, 5 and 6 were elected without opposition.
 Mayor: Rénald Grondin
 Councillor 1: Richard Paquet
 Councillor 2: Laurent Brière
 Councillor 3: Daniel Giroux
 Councillor 4: Jean-Guy Isabelle
 Councillor 5: Daniel Roy
 Councillor 6: Sylvie Laroche

Vallée-Jonction
All elected without opposition.
 Mayor: Lise Cloutier
 Councillor 1: Richard Lessard
 Councillor 2: Denis Labbé
 Councillor 3: Jeannyl Gilbert
 Councillor 4: Paul-Émile Turmel
 Councillor 5: Jocelyn Bourque
 Councillor 6: Marquis Voyer

2005 Quebec municipal elections
Chaudière-Appalaches